Capilloventrida is an order of annelids belonging to the class Clitellata.

Families:
 Capilloventridae

References

Clitellata